Yasuki is a masculine Japanese given name.

Possible writings
Yasuki can be written using many different combinations of kanji characters. Here are some examples:

康樹, "healthy, tree"
康機, "healthy, opportunity/machine"
康基, "healthy, foundation"
康輝, "healthy, sparkle"
康起, "healthy, rise/wake up"
靖樹, "peaceful, tree"
靖機, "peaceful, opportunity/machine"
靖基, "peaceful, foundation"
靖輝, "peaceful, sparkle"
靖起, "peaceful, rise/wake up"
安樹, "tranquil, tree"
安機, "tranquil, opportunity/machine"
安輝, "tranquil, sparkle"
保樹, "preserve, tree"
保機, "preserve, opportunity/machine"
保輝, "preserve, sparkle"
泰樹, "peaceful, tree"
泰機, "peaceful, opportunity/machine"
泰輝, "peaceful, sparkle"
易機, "divination, opportunity/machine"
易起, "divination, rise/wake up"

The name can also be written in hiragana やすき or katakana ヤスキ.

Notable people with the name
Yasuki Chiba (千葉 泰樹, 1910–1985) Japanese director and actor
, Japanese artist
, Japanese footballer
, Japanese footballer

Japanese masculine given names